The Revenge of Al Capone (also known as Capone) is a 1989 American television film about Al Capone starring Keith Carradine as Michael Rourke. The plot is not based on fact but rather is based on a revisionist interpretation of the 1933 attempted murder of President-elect Roosevelt by delusional anarchist Giuseppe Zangara.

Plot
Following his imprisonment, Al Capone still continues to run his crime empire and plots to assassinate the mayor of Chicago, Anton Cermak.

Cast
 Keith Carradine as Michael Rourke
 Ray Sharkey as Scarface
 Debrah Farentino as Jennie
 Charles Haid as Alex Connors
 Jayne Atkinson as Elizabeth
 Neil Giuntoli as Dutch Schultz
 Scott Paulin as Eliot Ness
 Alan Rosenberg as Frank Nitti
 Jordan Charney as J. Edgar Hoover
 Robert Bernedetti as Mayor Anton Cermak
 Conor O'Farrell as Sgt. Callahan

External links
 

1989 television films
1989 films
1989 crime drama films
Films about the American Mafia
American television films
Films directed by Michael Pressman
American crime drama films
Films about Al Capone
Cultural depictions of Al Capone
Cultural depictions of Eliot Ness
Cultural depictions of Dutch Schultz
Cultural depictions of J. Edgar Hoover
Cultural depictions of Frank Nitti
1980s American films